The Asahi Soft Drinks Challengers are an American football team located in Amagasaki, Hyogo, Japan.  They are a member of the X-League.

Team history
1978 Team founded as a practice team for the Momoyama Gakuin University's football team.  Team was nicknamed the 'Silver Tigers due to a majority of the team being fans of the Hanshin Tigers professional baseball team. 
1979 Joined the X-League X2 division.
1985 Promoted from X2 to X1.
1989 Team name changed from Silver Tigers to Red Bears.
1993 Sponsorship agreement with Asahi Soft Drinks. Team name changed from Red Bears to Wild Jo. Finished the season 5th in the division. Lost X2-X1 replacement game. Demoted to X2 for the following season.
1996 Team promoted from X2 to X1.
1998 Team name changed to Challengers. Advanced to the Final6 Semifinals.
2000 Won first Tokyo Super Bowl and Rice Bowl Championships.
2001 Won second Tokyo Super Bowl championship. Lost to Kwansei Gakuin 30-27 in the Rice Bowl.
2007 Won West division title. Lost to Kashima in the Final6 Semi-finals 7-24.

Seasons
{| class="wikitable"
|bgcolor="#FFCCCC"|X-League Champions (1987–present)
|bgcolor="#DDFFDD"|<small>Division Champions</small>
|bgcolor="#D0E7FF"|Final Stage/Semifinals Berth
|bgcolor="#96CDCD"|Wild Card /2nd Stage Berth
|}

Head coaches

Current import playersFormer Import players'''

References

External links
  (Japanese)

American football in Japan
1978 establishments in Japan
American football teams established in 1978
X-League teams